Sarafand al-Amar was a Palestinian Arab village situated on the coastal plain of Palestine, about  northwest of Ramla. It had a population of 1,950 in 1945 and a land area of 13,267 dunams.

The village's male population were razed by New Zealand forces in the aftermath of the Sinai and Palestine campaign, in an illegal retribution for the killing of a New Zealand soldier. It was then depopulated entirely during the 1948 Arab–Israeli War. 

Today it is part of the Israeli area of Tzrifin.

History

Ottoman period
Sarafand al-Amar was also known as Sarafand al-Kubra ("the larger Sarafand") to distinguish it from its nearby sister village, Sarafand al-Sughra ("the smaller Sarafand").

In 1596, Sarafand al-Kubra was under the administration of the nahiya ("subdistrict") of Ramla, part of the Liwa of Gaza in the Ottoman tax records. It had a population of 48 households and 17 bachelors; an estimated 358 persons, all Muslim. They paid a fixed tax-rate of 25% on agricultural products, including wheat, barley, sesame, fruit, orchards, beehives, and goats; a total of 14,000 akçe. All of the revenue went to a Waqf.

The Egyptian Sufi traveler Mustafa al-Dumyuti al-Luqaymi (d. 1764) reported visiting the shrine of Luqman (Luke) in Sarafand. The village appeared as an unnamed village on the map of Pierre Jacotin compiled in 1799.

In 1838, Edward Robinson reported that there were two villages by the name of Sarafand in the area, one of which was inhabited by Muslims and the other ruined. Thus, it may be that Sarafand al-Kubra became also known as "Sarafand al-Amar" from the Arabic 'amara meaning "to build up; populate". Both the Sarafand villages belonged to the District of Ibn Humar.

In 1863 Victor Guérin found here cut stones belonging to some old buildings, and two cisterns, apparently ancient. He thought the site was probably that of an old city called Sariphaia, mentioned as having been the seat of a bishop, one of its bishops took part in the Council of Jerusalem of the year 636.

An Ottoman village list of about 1870 indicated 60 houses and a population of 205 in Sarfend el Ammar, though the population count included men, only.

In 1882, the PEF's Survey of Western Palestine (SWP) described Sarafand al-ajar as a village built of adobe bricks and situated on rising ground; a few olive trees were scattered around it.

British Mandate

In December 1918, after World War I but prior to the Mandatory Palestine, New Zealand soldiers from the New Zealand Mounted Rifles Brigade camped near the village massacred its inhabitants as retribution for the murder of a New Zealand soldier. Between 40 and 120 people are believed to have been killed in the massacre, and many houses in the village were burnt to the ground.

In the British Mandate period (1920–1948), the British Army established their largest military base in the Middle East near Sarafand al-Amar and built the village up significantly. The British Army also contracted the Palestine Electric Corporation for wired electric power. While the military installations were fed by a high-tension line from 1925 onward, the village remained unconnected. The British also built a prison, also under the name of Sarafand, for Palestinian nationalist activists next to the base.

In the 1922 census of Palestine conducted by the British Mandate authorities, Sarafand al-Amar had a population of 862; 861 Muslims and 1 Jew, increasing in the 1931 census to 1183; 19 Christians and 1164 Muslims, in a total of 265 houses. During this period, Sarafand al-Amar was laid out in the shape of a rectangle and its houses were made of adobe.

Sarafand al-Amar was the site of a popular shrine for Luqman al-Hakim (Luke the Wise). The village had two elementary schools, one for boys and one for girls. The boys' school was founded in 1921 and became a full elementary school in 1946–47 with an enrollment of 292 students. The girls' school was founded in 1947 and had an enrollment of 50 students. Adjacent to it was the al-Raja ("Hope") Orphanage set up for the children of Palestinians killed during the 1936–39 Arab revolt in Palestine. In addition, Sarafand had a public hospital and an agricultural station.

In the 1945 statistics the population consisted of 1,910 Muslims and 40 Christians. Agriculture was the main economic activity, with citrus being the main crop. In 1944–45, a total of 3,059 dunams were devoted to citrus and bananas and 4,012 dunams were allocated to grains; 1,655 dunams were irrigated or used for orchards, while 36 dunams were classified as built-up, urban areas. The orchards were irrigated from artesian wells, while the rest of the crops were rain-fed. Artesian wells also provided drinking water.

1948 war and aftermath

On the morning of January 2, 1948, Arab workers at the British Army camp in Sarafand al-Amar discovered twelve timed charges set to explode at noon, a time when they would have been lined up to collect their wages. The Palestinian Arab newspaper Filastin noted that none of the Jewish workers in the camp had reported to work that day, implying that Zionist groups had warned them of an attack.

On April 15, 1948, a group of Haganah sappers carried out a raid on the village. According to a New York Times report, the attackers penetrated "deep into Arab territory" and demolished a three-storey building. British authorities stated that 16 people were killed and 12 wounded in the destruction of the building. The Haganah charged that the building was used by the Holy War Army of Hasan Salama, Palestinian guerrilla commander of the Jaffa district, and that 39 people were killed in the raid.
As the British Army evacuated Palestine in mid-May, they allowed Arab forces to take over the military base on May 14. According to the Haganah, a "small, semi-regular" Arab unit positioned there, but were driven out by two prolonged attacks from the southeast and the north; the Arab unit's defensive formation was only prepared for an attack from the Jewish town of Rishon LeZion in the west. No casualties were reported. Sarafand al-Amar was most likely captured on May 19–20 by the Second Battalion of the Givati Brigade during Operation Barak. The residents probably fled or were evicted at the same time.

Israel established the Tzrifin IDF military base on the ruins of Sarafand al-Amar and the British military base in 1949, and the town of Nir Tzvi was built on village lands in 1954. According to Palestinian historian Walid Khalidi, "the site, which contains what may be the largest Israeli army camp as well as an airbase, has been designated as a military base. No more than six houses remain; most of them are deserted, but one or two are occupied by Israelis. The school is also deserted..."

References

Bibliography

External links
Welcome To Sarafand al-'Amar
Sarafand al-'Amar, Zochrot
Survey of Western Palestine, Map 13: IAA, Wikimedia commons
Sarafand al-‘Amar, from the Khalil Sakakini Cultural Center

Arab villages depopulated during the 1948 Arab–Israeli War
District of Ramla